Bob Warren-Codrington (born 3 January 1950) is a Zimbabwean sports shooter. He competed in the mixed skeet event at the 1984 Summer Olympics.

References

External links
 

1950 births
Living people
Zimbabwean male sport shooters
Olympic shooters of Zimbabwe
Shooters at the 1984 Summer Olympics
Sportspeople from Harare